Niels Schlotterbeck (born 12 March 1967) is a German former professional footballer who played as a midfielder.

Personal life

He is the uncle of SC Freiburg’s Keven Schlotterbeck and Nico Schlotterbeck of Borussia Dortmund.

References

Living people
1967 births
German footballers
Footballers from Stuttgart
Association football midfielders
Stuttgarter Kickers players
Offenburger FV players
SC Freiburg players
MSV Duisburg players
FC Hansa Rostock players
TSV 1860 Munich players
Hannover 96 players
SK Vorwärts Steyr players
Qadsia SC players
SV Waldhof Mannheim players
APOEL FC players
Bundesliga players
2. Bundesliga players
Austrian Football Bundesliga players
Kuwait Premier League players
Expatriate footballers in Kuwait
Expatriate footballers in Cyprus
German expatriate sportspeople in Kuwait
German expatriate sportspeople in Cyprus
German expatriate sportspeople in Austria
Expatriate footballers in Austria